Frigate captain is a naval rank in the naval forces of several countries. Corvette captain lies one level below frigate captain.

It is usually equivalent to the Commonwealth/US Navy rank of commander.

Countries using this rank include Argentina, Colombia and Spain, France, Belgium, Italy, Brazil and Portugal, Croatia and Germany.

In the Royal Canadian Navy, capitaine de frégate is the official French language name for the rank of commander.

The NATO rank code is OF-4, the official translation for instance of the German Fregattenkapitän as well as the French capitaine de frégate into English is "commander senior grade".

Germany

Fregattenkapitän is a German Navy line officer rank OF-4 equivalent to Oberstleutnant (en: Lieutenant colonel) in the German Army and German Air Force.

Gallery

See also
 Frigate lieutenant

References

Naval ranks